David Courtney is a British singer and record producer.

David Courtney may also refer to:

David R. Courtney (born 1953), artist, writer, and political activist
Dave Courtney (born 1959), British gangster and author
"David Courtney", a song about the gangster by Rancid from their 2003 album Indestructible